Kheer Bhawani, Ksheer Bhawani or the Ragnya Devi temple is a Hindu temple situated at a distance of  north-east of Srinagar, Jammu and Kashmir, India, in the village of Tulmul in Ganderbal. It is dedicated to the Hindu goddess Kheer Bhavani constructed over a sacred spring. As is the custom with Hindu deities, the goddess has many names including Ragyna or Rajna, along with variations in honorifics such as devi, mata or bhagavati. The term kheer refers to a milk and rice pudding that is offered to propitiate the goddess. Kheer Bhawani is sometimes translated as 'Milk Goddess'. The worship of Kheer Bhawani is universal among the Hindus of Kashmir, most of them who worship her as their protective patron deity Kuladevi.

The sacred spring here has its own attached belief. An eponymously named mela is held annually here. It is one of the largest gatherings of Hindus in the region following the Amarnath pilgrimage. Maharaja Pratap Singh of Jammu and Kashmir and Maharaja Hari Singh contributed to building and renovating the temple. There are other temples to Kheer Bhawani in the region, such as Mata Kheer Bhawani Temple at Tikker, Kupwara, which has been renovated by the Indian Army.

Temple description 
The temple is one of the most important temples for Kashmiri Hindus in Kashmir. The resident deity, Kheer Bhawani, is a favourite in this region. A septagonal spring at the temple is situated around the goddess. The holy spring is known to change its colour with various hues of red, pink, orange, green, blue, and white. A black shade of the spring water is believed to be inauspicious. Most of the colours do not have any particular significance. In 1886, Walter Lawrence, the-then British settlement commissioner for land, during his visit to the spring, reported the water of the spring to have a violet tinge. The current form of the spring, temple pond, and temple were built under Maharaja Pratap Singh of Jammu and Kashmir in the 1910s. Maharaja Hari Singh further renovated the temple. The temple area has old-growth chinar trees beneath which the pilgrims sit or sleep on mats of grass.

Kheer Bhawani mela 
The Kheer Bhawani mela or festival sees the annual congregation of Kashmiri Hindus, and other pilgrims and tourists. The mela is during Jyeshtha Ashtami, also spelt as 'Zyeshta Astami'.The mela was threatened during terrorism  and Hindu exodus of 1990. It was restored with dedicated efforts of Indian Army contingent placed at Ganderbal. This place is one of the few exception where Hindu priests never left the Mandir despite serious terrorist threats.

History, contextual folklore and associated legends

Sri Lanka to Tulmul 
According to legend, Ragyna was pleased with the devotion of Ravana and appeared before him. Subsequently, Ravana got an image of the Goddess installed in Sri Lanka. However, the Goddess became displeased with Ravana's ruthlessness. With the help of Hanuman, she came to Tulmul. That night is called Ragnya Ratri.

Though Ragyna is a form or rupa of Durga, this one is a vaishnav form. Ragyna, also known as Tripurasundari, while in Lanka, was called Shayama. Ragniya is a Sattavie form of the goddess, i.e. the form of tranquility and bliss.

Rajatarangini and other texts 
The mention of Kheer Bhawani is found in Kalhana's Rajtarangini. Kalhana writes that the sacred spring of Tula Mula is situated in a marshy ground. Thousands of years ago, floods inundated the spring and temple. Kashmir's Yogi Krishna Pandit Taploo of Bohri Kadal, Srinagar had a dream in which the Goddess appeared to him and directed him to the location of the holy spring. It is also mentioned in the Bhrigu Samhita.

Abu'l-Fazl ibn Mubarak in his book Aini-Akbari mentions the area of Tula Mula extending over a region of hundred bighas (unit of land area) of land, which used to sink in the marshy lands during the summer season.

Swami Vivekananda's experience 
Swami Vivekananda visited Kashmir. During this stay, while ritually worshiping Khir Bhavani, the condition of the temple concerned him. In The Complete Works of Swami Vivekananda, the goddess tells Vivekananda, "It is My desire that I should live in a dilapidated temple, otherwise, can I not immediately erect a seven - storied temple of gold here if I like? What can you do? Shall I protect you or shall you protect me!" Swami Rama Tirtha also visited here to have the darshan of the place.

Parimoo's and Gopinath Bhan 
Pandit Prasad Joo Parimoo, a Kashmiri pandit, was a respected saint. His peers would call him Jada Bharata, who was a legendary saint of Puranas times. He used to live in Sekidafer area of Srinagar. He was married but didn't have any children so he is said to have finally adopted a son. He would regularly meditate at this holy spring and during one such occasion, while being in a meditative trance (samadhi), he is said to have had a vision of Mata Kheer Bhawani. The goddess reprimanded him for his hasty decision of going for an adoption when she was herself desirous of taking birth in his family as his daughter. Nonetheless, she is said to have blessed him with the boon and eventually Pandit Prasad Joo Parimoo's wife did give birth to a daughter. In the course of time the daughter married a pandit and gave birth to a son in 1898 who came to be known as Bhagwan Gopinath.

References 
Notes

Citations

External links 
 

Photographs of the mela
Kheer Bhawani Temple - The Divine India
A Video Presentation on Kheer Bhawani Temple
Mata Kheer Bhawani Ragnya in Tullmulla Kashmir

Hindu temples in Jammu and Kashmir
Tourist attractions in Ganderbal district